This is a list of newspapers in Northern Cyprus. There are a number of daily newspapers in Northern Cyprus, and they are all in Turkish. Kıbrıs has by far the highest circulation. The U.S. Department of State reported in 2002 that there were opposition newspapers which often criticized the government.

Daily
 Avrupa
 Diyalog
Kıbrıs 
Kıbrıs Postası
 Star Kıbrıs
 Yeni Düzen
 Havadis
 Yeni Bakış

Weekly
Cyprus Observer
Cyprus Today
Star International
Yeniçağ

Online
Kıbrıs Postası
Gazeddakibris
Özgür Gazete

See also
List of newspapers
Media of Cyprus
Ziligurti

References 
 TRNC Public Relations Department

Northern Cyprus

Newspapers
Newspapers